The Shire of Benalla was a local government area about  northeast of Melbourne, the state capital of Victoria, Australia. From 1948 onwards, Benalla itself was managed by a different entity, later known as the City of Benalla.

History

Benalla was first incorporated as a road district on 4 September 1868, and became a shire on 3 September 1869. The declared area included the Shire of Euroa, which was severed and incorporated on 3 November 1879.

Over the following years, the Shire of Benalla lost small amounts of territory at its edges:
 11 April 1895 - Parts of the Warrenbayne Riding was transferred to the Shire of Violet Town;
 23 December 1903 - Parts of the Devenish Riding was transferred to the Shire of Shepparton;
 31 May 1906 - Parts of the Mokoan Riding was transferred to the Shire of Wangaratta.

On 1 September 1948, after considerable growth of Benalla as a regional centre, the Central Riding was severed, and became the Borough of Benalla, later becoming the City of Benalla, on 26 May 1965. On four occasions (10 April 1956, 1 February 1964, 17 September 1969, 13 February 1980), land was transferred to the City of Benalla.

On 18 November 1994, the Shire of Benalla was abolished, and along with the City of Benalla, the Shire of Mansfield, and the Warrenbayne district of the Shire of Violet Town, was merged into the newly created Shire of Delatite. The Glenrowan district was transferred to the newly created Rural City of Wangaratta.

The Shire of Delatite itself was abolished in 2002, with its former area divided between the Rural City of Benalla and the Shire of Mansfield.

Wards

The Shire of Benalla was divided into four ridings, each of which elected three councillors:
 Devenish Riding
 Mokoan Riding
 Tatong Riding
 Warrenbayne Riding

Towns and localities
 Archerton
 Baddaginnie
 Boweya
 Boxwood
 Bungeet
 Chesney Vale
 Devenish
 Glenrowan
 Goomalibee
 Goorambat
 Lake Mokoan
 Lake Nilacootie
 Lima
 Lurg
 Molyullah
 Moorngag
 Samaria
 Stewarton
 Swanpool
 Taminick
 Tarnook
 Tatong
 Thoona
 Toorour Reservoir
 Upper Lurg
 Warrenbayne
 Winton

Population

* Estimate in the 1958 Victorian Year Book.
+ The combined population of the Shire and Borough in 1954 was 10,452.

References

Benalla
1868 establishments in Australia
1994 disestablishments in Australia